The Kyrgyzstan women's national rugby union team are a national sporting side of Kyrgyzstan, representing them in Women's rugby union. The side have only played two test matches at the 2008 Asia Rugby Women's Championship (then ARFU) in Kazakhstan.

Record
(Full internationals only)

Full internationals

See also
 Rugby union in Kyrgyzstan

External links
 Kyrgyzstan on IRB.com

Asian national women's rugby union teams
Sport in Kyrgyzstan
Women's national rugby union teams
Rugby union in Kyrgyzstan
Rugby union